Alla mot en ("Everybody against one") was a Swedish game show that aired for two seasons on TV4, based on the Endemol format 1 vs. 100.

It was based on one person competing against 100 audience members for a cash prize.

In January 2004, TV4 moved the long-running Bingolotto from the Saturday slot it had occupied since 1991 to early Saturday evening. The early Saturday evening would then be used for Alla mot en. The first season, the show was also affiliated with Bingolotto, meaning that the 100 competing audience members were selected through the Bingolotto lottery and they would also win several prices such as cars and travels. The second season, the show was affiliated with Sverigelotten, a part of Bingolotto.

References

TV4 (Sweden) original programming
Swedish game shows
2004 Swedish television series debuts
2005 Swedish television series endings
2000s Swedish television series